Włodzimierz Lucjan Krygier (29 January 1900 – 17 September 1975) was a Polish ice hockey and football player. For hockey, he competed in the 1928 and 1932 Winter Olympics.

He was born in Yekaterinoslav, Russian Empire and died in London, Great Britain.

In 1928 he participated with the Polish ice hockey team in the Olympic tournament.

Four years later he was a member of the Polish team which finished fourth in the 1932 Olympic tournament. He played five matches.

He fought in the September Campaign of World War II.

References

External links
 profile 

1900 births
1975 deaths
AZS Warszawa (ice hockey) players
Ice hockey players at the 1928 Winter Olympics
Ice hockey players at the 1932 Winter Olympics
Olympic ice hockey players of Poland
Footballers from Dnipro
People from Yekaterinoslav Governorate
People from the Russian Empire of Polish descent
Polish military personnel of World War II
Polish footballers
Poland international footballers
Association football forwards
Polonia Warsaw players